The 2007–08 Syracuse Orange men's basketball team represented Syracuse University. The team's head coach was Jim Boeheim, serving for his 32nd year. They played its home games at the Carrier Dome in Syracuse, New York.  The team finished with a 21–14 (9–9) record, while making it to the quarterfinal round of the NIT tournament.  Junior Eric Devendorf was the team's elder classman for 2007–08 squad, starting at shooting guard. Sophomores Arinze Onuaku (center), and Paul Harris (guard/forward) and standout freshmen Donté Greene (forward) and Jonny Flynn (guard) rounded out the rest of the starting lineup. Following an injury to Devendorf, guard Scoop Jardine stepped in and Kristof Ongenaet also saw time in the starting lineup.

Roster

Developments
Eric Devendorf and Andy Rautins both suffered season-ending knee injuries
Scoop Jardine was suspended for three games
Josh Wright and Devin Brennan-McBride both quit the team
Donté Greene declared for the NBA draft following the conclusion of the season
Jonny Flynn was named co-Big East Rookie of the Year
This marked the first season since 1982 that Syracuse missed back-to-back NCAA Tournaments

References

Syracuse Orange
Syracuse Orange men's basketball seasons
Syracuse Orange
Syracuse Orange men's b
Syracuse Orange men's b